Lusin may refer to:

 Lu Xun (1881–1936), Chinese writer
 Nikolai Luzin (1883–1950), Russian mathematician
 Lošinj, an island in Croatia
 Luzino, a village in Wejherowo County, Pomeranian Voivodeship, in Poland
 "Lusin" (song), by Garik Papoyan and Sona Rubenyan, 2017

See also
 Lusina (disambiguation)
 Lusine, American musician

Italian-language surnames